Presidential elections were held in Iceland on 29 June 1996. The result was a victory for Ólafur Ragnar Grímsson, who received 41.4% of the vote.

Prime minister Davíð Oddsson and former foreign minister Jón Baldvín Hannibalsson considered running in the election. Guðrún Pétursdóttir, an academic, ran, but withdrew from the race ten days prior to the election date.

Ólafur was considered a left-wing politician at the time, having been the leader of the left-wing People's Alliance from 1987 to 1995. Guðrún Agnarsdóttir, a former member of parliament for the Women's List, was considered on the left as well. Pétur Hafstein announced his candidacy shortly after Davíð decided not to run. Pétur was a Supreme Court judge, and was expected to appeal to voters of the conservative Independence Party. Ólafur's campaign was described by political scientist Ólafur Harðarson as "Americanized", as Ólafur emphasized his personal qualities rather than his political background and views.

Results

References

Presidential elections in Iceland
Presidential election
Iceland
Iceland